Radical orthodoxy is a Christian theological and philosophical school of thought which makes use of postmodern philosophy to reject the paradigm of modernity. The movement was founded by John Milbank and others and takes its name from the title of a collection of essays published by Routledge in 1999: Radical Orthodoxy: A New Theology, edited by Milbank, Catherine Pickstock, and Graham Ward. Although the principal founders of the movement are Anglicans, radical orthodoxy includes theologians from a number of ecclesial traditions.

Beginnings

Radical orthodoxy's beginnings are found in the Radical Orthodoxy series of books, the first of which (Radical Orthodoxy: A New Theology) was edited by John Milbank, Catherine Pickstock, and Graham Ward. Milbank's Theology and Social Theory (1990), while not part of this series, is considered the first significant text of the movement. The name radical orthodoxy was chosen initially since it was a more "snappy" title for the book series—initially Milbank considered the movement to be "postmodern critical Augustinianism", emphasizing the use of a reading of Augustine of Hippo influenced by the insights of postmodernism in the work of the group. The name was also chosen in opposition to certain strands of so-called radical theology, for example those of John Shelby Spong; those strands asserted a highly liberal version of Christian faith where certain doctrines, for example the Trinity  were denied in an attempt to respond to modernity: in contrast to this, radical orthodoxy attempted to show how the orthodox interpretation of Christian faith (as given primarily in the ecumenical creeds) was the more radical response to contemporary issues and more rigorous and intellectually sustainable.

Main ideas
Milbank has summarized radical orthodoxy in seven interrelated main ideas:
 The denial of a clean distinction between faith and reason, or reason and revelation, such that human knowledge is knowledge only insofar as it is illuminated by divine truth.
 All of creation can be understood only as participating in God's being, and as such, gleans for us glimpses of the nature of God, without fully comprehending it.
 Human constructs (e.g. culture, community, language, history, technology) also participate in the being of God. It is neither "incidental to the truth" nor "a barrier against it".
 Theology functions through theurgy, "a co-operation between human and divine work", which both ultimately belong to God. This work (and its exchanges) is called liturgy, where "a collective human action invites the divine descent".
 A rejection of postmodern nihilism, which concludes that since there is no grounding for truth in "an absolutely certain intuitive presence", then there is no such thing as truth to begin with. Radical orthodoxy concedes that truth has no absolute grounding or finite certainty, but reads this lack of grounding as orienting the finite toward the eternal. Rationalism is thus evil because it makes humanity its own arbiter of truth, thereby contradicting the incarnate God's revelation of his own eternal truth. This can be seen throughout all history, but it is most centralized in the Church.
 "Without God, people see a nullity at the heart of things. They regard death as more real than life. This means that body gets hollowed out and abstraction becomes the true permanent reality, as in 'all is decay'. Only a belief in transcendence and participation in transcendence actually secures the reality of matter and the body. God transcends body, but is, as it were, even more body than body. So radical orthodoxy insists on a valuation of the body, sexuality, the sensory and the aesthetic"; while still sustaining that asceticism as severe discipline of the body which orients itself to God "is necessary to preserve this valuation".
 Humans also participate in the being of nature and of other humans. Because of this, salvation is as much cosmic as it is communal. Salvation then brings forth "a liberation of nature from terror and distress" to its fullest harmony and beauty, and a maximally democratic and socialist cooperation between humans, "on the basis of a common recognition of true virtue and excellence". To this end, the Church foreshadows the fully realized kingdom of God.
Underlying these is the return to theology as the "queen of the sciences" or the highest of all possible human knowledge, and a postmodern reaffirmation of ancient and medieval orthodox theologies.

Influences
Henri de Lubac's theological work on the distinction of nature and grace has been influential in the movement's articulation of ontology. Hans Urs von Balthasar's theological aesthetics and literary criticism are also influential. The strong critique of liberalism found in much of radical orthodoxy has its origin in the work of Karl Barth. The Oxford Movement and the Cambridge Platonists are also key influences of radical orthodoxy.

A form of neoplatonism plays a significant role in radical orthodoxy. Syrian Iamblichus of Chalcis and the Byzantine Proclus (412–485) are occasionally sourced, while the theology of Augustine of Hippo, Gregory of Nyssa, Thomas Aquinas, Nicholas of Cusa, and Meister Eckhart is often drawn upon.

One of the key tasks of radical orthodoxy is to criticize the philosophy of Duns Scotus. Duns Scotus's theory that the term "being" is used univocally of God and creatures is often presented as the precursor of modernity. 

The majority within the movement appear to support John Milbank's "Blue Socialism" in politics, although some have aligned with the traditionalist-conservative "Red Tory" movement in the UK and Canada.

Reception

This reading of Scotus has been criticised itself by Daniel Horan and Thomas Williams, both of whom claim that the radical orthodox movement confuses Scotus' epistemology and semantics with ontology.

See also

Neo-orthodoxy
New Monasticism
Paleo-orthodoxy
Postliberal theology
Postmodern Christianity

References

Footnotes

Bibliography

Further reading

External links 
Radical Orthodoxy Online (archived): Collection of resources (original)
Radical Orthodoxy Bibliography: Bibliography related to Radical Orthodoxy (both pro- and con)
The Centre of Theology and Philosophy: an outgrowth of the Theology Department of the University of Nottingham

Christian radicalism
Christian theological movements
Postmodernism